The 2018 BOSS GP season was the 24th season of the BOSS GP series. The championship began on 22 April at Hockenheim and finished on 14 October at Paul Ricard.

Teams and Drivers

Calendar

Championship standings
 Points for both championships were awarded as follows:

Drivers Standings

References

External links
 

Boss GP
Boss GP